Jessica Tatiana Long (born February 29, 1992) is a Russian-American Paralympic swimmer from Baltimore, Maryland, who competes in the S8, SB7 and SM8 category events. She has held many world records and competed at five Paralympic Games, winning 29 medals (16 of them gold). She has also won over 50 world championship medals.

Early life
Long was born Tatiana Olegovna Kirillova in Bratsk, Russia. At the time she was born, her mother and father were unwed teenagers, 17 and 18 years old respectively. She was abandoned by her mother in a foster care and was later adopted by American parents at the age of 13 months. Because of fibular hemimelia, her lower legs were amputated when she was 18 months old. She learned to walk with prostheses. Long has been involved in many sports including gymnastics, cheerleading, ice skating, biking, trampoline, and rock climbing. She began swimming in her grandparents' pool before joining her first competitive team in 2002. The next year, Long was selected as Maryland Swimming's 2003 Female Swimmer with a Disability 
of the Year. Long trained with the North Baltimore Aquatic Club.

Long's adoptive brother, Joshua, was adopted at the same time from the same Siberian orphanage.

International swimming career

Long entered the international stage at the 2004 Paralympic Games in Athens, Greece, winning three gold medals in swimming. Aged twelve at the time, she was the youngest competitor on the U.S. Paralympic Team. One of her gold medals was the 100-meter freestyle, which she swam just 0.19 seconds ahead of Paralympic-record-holder and world-record-holder Israeli Keren Leibovitch.

Long had 18 world record-breaking performances in 2006. Her performance at the 2006 International Paralympic Committee (IPC) Swimming World Championships in Durban, South Africa where she won nine gold medals for her participation in seven individual medleys and two relays. She also held five world records which made her known from outside the world of Paralympic sport. In 2006, Long became the first Paralympic athlete selected as the AAU's James E. Sullivan Award winner. She was honored as the U.S. Olympic Committee's 2006 Paralympian of the year and Swimming World Magazine's 2006 Disabled Swimmer of the Year.

In June 2021 the US announced the 34 Paralympic swimmers who would be going to the delayed 2020 Summer Paralympics in Tokyo. Long was named as the lead for the women's team of McKenzie Coan, Elizabeth Marks, Rebecca Meyers and Mallory Weggemann.

On April 14, 2022, Long was named to the roster to represent the United States at the 2022 World Para Swimming Championships.

Major achievements:

CR: Championship Record; WR: World Record
 2004: Three gold medals, 100m freestyle, 400m freestyle, 4 × 100 m freestyle relay – Paralympic Games, Athens, Greece
 2005: Five gold medals, bronze medal, two world records, and named Swimmer of the Meet – 2005 U.S. Paralympics Open Swimming Championships, Minneapolis, Minnesota
 2006: Two world records (100m butterfly, 200m individual medley) – Blaze Sports Georgia Open, Atlanta, Georgia
 2006: U.S. Olympic Committee Female Athlete of the Month – January 2006
 2006: Five gold medals, silver medal, four world records (50m breaststroke, 50m butterfly, 200m breaststroke, 400m individual medley) – Can-Am Championships, London, Ontario, Canada
 2006: Named winner of 77th AAU James E. Sullivan Award
 2006: Named Disabled Swimmer of the Year by Swimming World magazine
 2006: Named U.S. Olympic Committee Paralympian of the Year
 2006: Second place Rock Climbing Speed Climbing – Extremity Games
 2006: Selected as USA Swimming's Disability Swimmer of the Year (Trischa L. Zorn Award)
 2006: Two world records (100m butterfly, 200m individual medley) – Belgian Open, Antwerp, Belgium
 2006: Nine gold medals (100m freestyle – WR, 100m butterfly – WR, 200m individual medley – WR, 400m freestyle – WR, 34pts 4 × 100 m freestyle relay – WR, 50m freestyle, 100m backstroke, 100m breaststroke, 34pts 4 × 100 m medley relay) – International Paralympic Committee (IPC) Swimming World Championships, Durban, South Africa
 2007: Three world records (200m backstroke, 400m individual medley, 800m freestyle) – Spring Can-Am Swimming Championships, Montreal, Canada
 2007: Three world records (50m butterfly, 200m freestyle, 1500m freestyle) – GTAC Disability Open, Oakland University, Rochester, Michigan
 2007: Recipient of the ESPN Best Female Athlete with a Disability ESPY Award
 2007: Selected as USA Swimming's Disability Swimmer of the Year (Trischa L. Zorn Award)
 2007: First place, 50m backstroke, 50m butterfly, 100m backstroke, 100m breaststroke, 100m freestyle, 200m butterfly; second place, 50m freestyle – U.S. Paralympics Open Swimming Championships, College Park, Md.
 2008:  World record, S8 100m butterfly – Can-Am Championships, Victoria, Canada
 2008: Recipient of Juan Antonio Samaranch IOC Disabled Athlete Award
 2008: Four gold medals, three world records (400m freestyle – WR, 100m freestyle – WR, 200m individual medley – WR, 100m butterfly); silver medal (100m backstroke); bronze medal (100m breaststroke) – International Paralympic Committee (IPC) – Paralympic Games, Beijing, China
 2009: Seven gold medals (100m breaststroke, 100m butterfly, 50m freestyle, 50m butterfly, 400m freestyle, 50m breaststroke, 100m freestyle) – Spring Can-Am Championships, Gresham, Oregon
 2009: Seven gold medals, world record, S8 100m breaststroke – Summer Can-Am Championships, Edmonton, Alberta, Canada
 2009: Four gold medals and world records (100m freestyle – WR, 400m freestyle – WR, 100m breaststroke – WR, 100m butterfly – WR); four silver medals (50m freestyle, 100m individual medley, 200m individual medley, 34 pts 4 × 100 m freestyle relay) – International Paralympic Committee (IPC) Swimming World Championships 25m, Rio de Janeiro, Brazil
 2010: Six gold medals (50m freestyle, 100m freestyle, 400m freestyle, 100m breaststroke, 100m butterfly, 100m breaststroke) – Can-Am National Championships, San Antonio, Texas
 2010: Seven gold medals, two world records (100m freestyle, 400m freestyle, 100m backstroke, 100m butterfly, 200m individual medley – WR, 34pts 4 × 100 m freestyle relay – WR, 34pts 4 × 100 m medley relay); two silver medals (50m freestyle, 100m breaststroke) – International Paralympic Committee (IPC) Swimming World Championships, Eindhoven, the Netherlands
 2011: Nine gold medals, four world records (50m freestyle, 100m freestyle – WR, 400m freestyle – WR, 100m butterfly – WR, 100m backstroke, 100m breaststroke, 200m individual medley – WR, 34pts 4 × 100 m freestyle relay, 34pts 4 × 100 m medley relay) – Pan Pacific Para Swimming Championships, Edmonton, Canada
 2011: Six gold medals (100m freestyle, 100m breaststroke, 50m backstroke, 100m backstroke, 100m butterfly, 200m individual medley) – Can-Am Open Swimming Championship, La Mirada, California
 2011: Named Disabled Swimmer of the Year by Swimming World magazine
 2012: Recipient of the ESPN Best Female Athlete with a Disability ESPY Award
 2012: Five gold medals (100m butterfly, 400m freestyle, 100m breaststroke, 200m indiv. medley, 100m freestyle); two silver medals (4 × 100 m freestyle 34pts, 100m backstroke); bronze medal (4 × 100 m medley 34pts) – International Paralympic Committee (IPC) – Paralympic Summer Games, London, England
 2012: Named U.S. Paralympic SportsWoman of the Year by the United States Olympic Committee
 2013: Three gold medals (100m freestyle, 200m individual medley, 400m Free) – U.S. Paralympics Spring Swimming Nationals/Can-Am, Minneapolis, Minnesota
 2013: Three gold medals, world record (200m individual medley, 400m freestyle, 100m butterfly – WR); silver medal (100m freestyle); bronze medal (4X100m freestyle) – International Paralympic Committee (IPC) Swimming World Championships, Montreal, Quebec, Canada
 2013: Recipient of the ESPN Best Female Athlete with a Disability ESPY Award
 2014: Four gold medals (100m freestyle, 200m individual medley, 100m backstroke, 400m freestyle) – U.S. Paralympics Spring Swimming Nationals/Can-Am, Miami, Florida
 2014: Six gold medals (100m freestyle, 100m breaststroke, 4x100 freestyle, 400m freestyle, 100m butterfly, 200 Individual Medley); two silver medals (100m backstroke, 4X100 medley) – Pan Pacific Para-Swimming Championships, Pasadena, California
 2014: Named Para-Swimming Female Athlete of the Year by swimming news website SwimSwam
 2015: Four gold medals (100m butterfly, 100m breaststroke, 200m individual medley, 400m freestyle); three silver medals (100m freestyle, 4 × 100 m freestyle relay, 100m backstroke) – International Paralympic Committee (IPC) Swimming World Championships, Glasgow, Scotland
 2015: Selected as USA Swimming's Disability Swimmer of the Year (Trischa L. Zorn Award)
 2016: One gold medal (200m individual medley SM8); three silver medals (100 m  breaststroke SB7, 400 m freestyle S8, 4×100 m freestyle 34 pts ); two bronze medals (100 m butterfly S8, 100 m backstroke S8) – International Paralympic Committee (IPC) – Paralympic Summer Games, Rio de Janeiro, Brazil

In popular media
A special NBC broadcast in 2014, Long Way Home, followed Long's journey to meet her biological parents. The story of her adoption was portrayed in a Toyota ad, titled Upstream, which ran as a Super Bowl commercial in 2021 and during the 2020 Summer Olympics and 2020 Summer Paralympics.

See also
 List of IPC world records in swimming
 List of Paralympic records in swimming

Bibliography
 Long, Jessica with Hannah Long. Unsinkable: From Russian Orphan to Paralympic Swimming World Champion. China, Houghton Mifflin Harcourt, June 26, 2018. .

References

External links

 
 A Step Ahead Prosthetics – Designer/Builder of Jessica's Custom Prosthetics
 
 
 

1992 births
American amputees
American disabled sportspeople
American female backstroke swimmers
American female breaststroke swimmers
American female butterfly swimmers
American female freestyle swimmers
Sportspeople with limb difference
James E. Sullivan Award recipients
Living people
Medalists at the 2004 Summer Paralympics
Medalists at the 2008 Summer Paralympics
Medalists at the 2012 Summer Paralympics
Medalists at the 2016 Summer Paralympics
Medalists at the 2020 Summer Paralympics
Paralympic bronze medalists for the United States
Paralympic gold medalists for the United States
Paralympic silver medalists for the United States
Paralympic swimmers of the United States
People from Bratsk
Russian emigrants to the United States
American people of Russian descent
S8-classified Paralympic swimmers
Swimmers at the 2004 Summer Paralympics
Swimmers at the 2008 Summer Paralympics
Swimmers at the 2012 Summer Paralympics
Swimmers at the 2016 Summer Paralympics
Swimmers at the 2020 Summer Paralympics
World record holders in paralympic swimming
Medalists at the World Para Swimming Championships
Paralympic medalists in swimming
Swimmers from Maryland
Sportspeople from Baltimore
21st-century American women